Fobdown is a hamlet in Hampshire, England. It is in the civil parish of Old Alresford.

Villages in Hampshire